Marina de Guevara (died 1559), was a Spanish nun. Accused of being a Lutheran by the Spanish Inquisition, she was executed in the famous auto da fe in Valladolid on 8 October 1559.

References

People executed for heresy
1559 deaths
16th-century Spanish people
16th-century Spanish women
16th-century executions by Spain
People executed by the Spanish Inquisition